Simon Vaughan (born 13 January 1970) is a British film and television producer and executive producer. Vaughan began his career as a child actor after being cast as Freddie Mainwaring in the BBC series Grange Hill.

In 2009 Vaughan founded Lookout Point, a London-based drama production company with his wife Justine Vaughan. At Lookout Point Vaughan acted as CEO (and later Chairman and Joint CEO) before stepping down in January 2019, following the sale of Lookout Point to the BBC.

In 2019 Vaughan launched The Media Investment Company with BBC Studios alum Helen Jackson. In June 2021, the company re-launched as The Story Company announcing a new partnership with LA based Endeavor Content.

Early life 
Vaughan was born in Kingston-Upon-Thames. He attended Danes Hill school in Surrey and Italia Conti Academy of Theatre Arts. Vaughan began his professional acting career in 1981 (aged 11) as Macduff’s son in Macbeth at the Thorndike Theatre.

He later played Peter in the stage adaptation of The Railway Children at the Crucible Theatre, Sheffield in 1984.

He also appeared as Freddie Mainwaring in the BBC’s long running series Grange Hill between 1987-1988.

Career 
In 1991, Vaughan joined Pickwick Home Video (part of the Carlton Television Group)  which acquired and sold the rights to Beatrix Potter’s The World of Peter Rabbit and Friends (1993). In 1993, Vaughan joined BMG Entertainment where he commissioned Peter and the Wolf for the ABC Network, which won an Emmy Award for Best Children's Programme in 1995, and The Wind in The Willows collection for the Disney Channel and Channel 4.

After leaving BMG Vaughan executive produced the television programmes Watership Down for ITV, Disney and ProSieben (1999). Vaughan later delivered the television film A Bear Named Winnie (2004) starring Michael Fassbender in his first lead role. In 2005 Vaughan co-founded Alchemy Television  where he executive produced Emmy Award nominated television film Coco Chanel (2008)  starring Shirley MacLaine, and Ben Hur (2010) for ABC Network. Alchemy also invested in and distributed The Company (2007), Ridley Scott’s CIA origin story for TNT & BBC and 5 seasons of procedural crime series Flashpoint for CBS.

In 2009 Vaughan launched production company Lookout Point, which was fully acquired by the BBC Group in 2018. At Lookout Point Vaughan executive produced the television programmes: Titanic (2012) written by Julian Fellowes for ITV and ABC Network, Parade's End (2012) for the BBC and HBO, starring Benedict Cumberbatch, which won the BAFTA for best mini-series in 2013  and Ripper Street (2012-2016), which ran on the BBC for five seasons. In 2016 Vaughan executive produced War and Peace (2016) for the BBC which was adapted by Andrew Davies and won a BAFTA for Production Design in 2017; and The Collection (2016) which was created by Oliver Goldstick and was Amazon’s first European original commission.

Lookout Point have also produced: Les Misérables (2018) for the BBC written by Andrew Davies and starring Olivia Colman, Dominic West and David Oyelowo, Mike Bartlett’s Press for BBC One and PBS (2018); and Sally Wainwright’s series Gentleman Jack for the BBC and HBO, starring Suranne Jones who won a Lead Actress BAFTA for her role in 2020.

In 2017 Vaughan co-wrote and executive produced the feature film Goodbye Christopher Robin (2017) for Fox Searchlight starring Margot Robbie and Domhnall Gleeson

Credits

Film

Film and Television Film

As an Actor

References

External links

British film producers
British film production company founders
British television producers
People from London
Alumni of the Italia Conti Academy of Theatre Arts
Grange Hill
1970 births
Living people